In the 1893 Iowa State Senate elections Iowa voters elected state senators to serve in the twenty-fifth Iowa General Assembly. Elections were held in 24 of the state senate's 50 districts. State senators serve four-year terms in the Iowa State Senate.

A statewide map of the 50 state Senate districts in the 1893 elections is provided by the Iowa General Assembly here.

The general election took place on November 7, 1893.

Following the previous election, Democrats had control of the Iowa Senate with 25 seats to Republicans' 24 seats and one seat held by the People's Party.

To claim control of the chamber from Democrats, the Republicans needed to net 2 Senate seats.

Republicans claimed control of the Iowa State Senate following the 1893 general election with the balance of power shifting to Republicans holding 34 seats, Democrats having 16 seats, and the People's Party losing its lone seat (a net gain of 10 seats for Republicans).

Summary of Results
Note: The holdover Senators not up for re-election are not listed on this table.

Source:

Detailed Results
NOTE: The Iowa Official Register does not contain detailed vote totals for state senate elections in 1893.

See also
 Elections in Iowa

References

Iowa Senate
Iowa
Iowa Senate elections